The 2017–18 Premier League Tournament Tier B was the second division of the 30th season of first-class cricket in Sri Lanka's Premier Trophy. The tournament was contested by nine teams, starting on 15 December 2017 and concluding on 18 February 2018. 

Panadura Sports Club finished top of the table in the 2016–17 Tier B tournament, but it was runners-up Sri Lanka Ports Authority Cricket Club who were promoted to Tier A due to a match-fixing scandal that resulted in a match between Panadura SC and Kalutara Physical Culture Club in January 2017 being declared null and void. They were replaced in Tier B by Galle Cricket Club after they were relegated from the 2016–17 Tier A tournament. In another change from the previous season, Negombo Cricket Club replaced Kalutara Physical Culture Club, who dropped out of the first-class system.

Negombo Cricket Club won the tournament and secured promotion to Tier A, after finishing top of the points table ahead of Lankan Cricket Club.

Points table

 Promoted to Tier A

Matches

Round 1

Round 2

Round 3

Round 4

Round 5

Round 6

Round 7

Round 8

Round 9

See also
 2017–18 Premier League Tournament Tier A

References

External links
 Series home at ESPN Cricinfo

Premier League Tournament Tier B
Premier League Tournament Tier B
Premier League Tournament Tier B